Marc Kaschke is an American politician who is the former mayor of North Platte, Nebraska. He was defeated by Dwight Livingston in 2012.

References

Mayors of places in Nebraska
Nebraska Republicans
People from North Platte, Nebraska
Living people
Year of birth missing (living people)
Place of birth missing (living people)
21st-century American politicians